Wuhan University School of Economics and Management is a school for the study of economics and management in Wuhan University. Established in 1893, the school is part of the Faculty of Social Sciences. The school was formerly known as the School of Business. The school's MBA and EMBA programs are accredited by AMBA. The School was accredited by EQUIS in 2016and by AACSB in 2022.

Majors
The school has two concentrations: economics and management. It has eight national key majors, four tier one doctoral programs out of 22 such programs, 13 professional master programs and 26 academic master programs, 18 undergraduate majors, and 4 post doctoral programs.

References

External links
School of Economics and Management

Wuhan University Faculty of Social Sciences
Business schools in China